Armand Jean François Séguin or Segouin (21 March 1767 – 24 January 1835) was a French chemist and physiologist who discovered a faster and cheaper process for tanning leather. As a result, he became immensely rich through the supply of leather to Napoleon's armies. He was born on March 21, 1767 in Paris and died on January 23, 1835.

Scientific career

From 1789 he was involved in several important areas of scientific research: the composition of water, the physiology of respiration and perspiration, and in determining techniques for the fusion and analysis of platinum.

Armand Seguin was a collaborator and human guinea pig with Antoine Lavoisier in his experiments on animal respiration.

Lavoisier had an interest in the purification of platinum and its use in making vessels for use in chemical research. In 1790 presented a paper Observations on Platinum to the Académie des Sciences with which he showed some examples of the work of Marc Etienne Janety, the Royal Goldsmith to Louis XVI who had found himself left with a large stock of platinum when the French Revolution reduced the demand.

Lavoisier was otherwise occupied and passed the research project to Seguin. James Hall the Scottish geologist records visiting Lavoisier in Paris in 1791:

Seguin and Lavoisier attempted to solve the problem of purification and approached Josiah Wedgwood for an advice on suitable refractory, he was unable to help and passed on the request to Joseph Priestley who said he considered magnesia to be the most likely substance to withstand such intense heats. In the end their attempt failed and it was left to Jannetty to solve and to sell his stock of platinum.

From  1790 until his death Seguin was associated with the editorial board of the scientific journal Annales de chimie et de physique, which is still published, now named Annales de chimie et de physique. After Lavoisier's execution in 1794 Seguin started a collaboration with Lavoisier's widow, Marie-Anne Pierrette Paulze, to publish a memoir of her husband. This ended abruptly when, according to  Madame Lavoisier, Seguin gave too much importance to his own collaboration with the father of modern chemistry and also refused to publicly condemn the murderers of Lavoisier.

In 1802, Armand Séguin worked with Bernard Courtois at the École Polytechnique on the study of opium. Together they isolated morphine, the first known alkaloid, from opium. Séguin presented his first memoir on opium to the French Institute in 1804 but failed to mention Coutois' contribution.

It was his meticulous chemical research into the process of tanning that shaped his later life.

Tanning

Seguin built a tanning factory on the Île de Sèvres, granted to him by the Republic, and later known as the Île Seguin in the Seine at Boulogne-Billancourt, near Paris. He became extremely rich by becoming the supplier of Bonaparte's army and joined the merchants responsible for raising funds for the French Treasury. His daughter Zoe later sold the Île Seguin and his family lived for several generations off his colossal fortune.

Family
Séguin was the son of Hector Hyacinte Ségouin (1731 - ) a Notary at Chartres and Marie Anne Madeleine Chancerel.

In Paris Séguin's house in the rue d’Anjou adjoined that of Jacques Collard (1758-1838) the grandfather of Marie-Fortunée Lafarge and she recounts her memories of him and his children.

He married a “noble, but poor girl”, Marie Emilie Félicité Raffard de Marcilly (1773-1862) the daughter of Hyppolite Félicité Raffard de Marcilly a Notary in Alençon and Gabrielle Russon. They had two children: Abel - Armand Félix Abel Séguin (1799-1873) and Zoé - Félicité Marie Zoé Séguin. Madame Lafarge says the children of the two families “formed one of those close relationships which endure through life with all their radiant reminiscences”.

In later life Séguin became increasingly eccentric. Among others, he developed a passion for horses and made the acquaintance of Adam Elmore, an English horse-breeder who kept stables near Hyde Park.

The links with the Elmore family continued, Abel married Louisa Elmore (a cousin of Adam?), and their son George Able Séguin married Adam's great-niece Lydia Elmore.

Armand Séguin (1869-1903), a painter of the Pont-Aven School, was one of Séguin’s great-grandchildren.

References

Further reading 
 Rapport au Comité de Salut Public, sur les nouveaux Moyens de tanner les Cuirs, proposés par le cit. Armand Seguin, Annales de Chimie, tome 19, p. 15—77
 Crosland, M. (2003), Research schools of chemistry from Lavoisier to Wurtz, The British Journal for the History of Science, 36; 3; 333-361.
 Gillispie, C. (1970). Dictionary of Scientific Biography. Charles Scribner's sons, New York. Vol 12, pp. 286–287

19th-century French chemists
1767 births
1835 deaths